

References

1986
Soviet
Films